Serhii Vasylovych Kivalov (born 1 May 1954) is a Ukrainian politician and jurist who served as the head of Central Election Commission during the 2004 Ukrainian presidential election which led to the Orange Revolution.

Along with Vadym Kolesnichenko, he is the co-author of the bill On principles of the state language policy adopted in 2012.

From the 1998 Ukrainian parliamentary election until the 2019 Ukrainian parliamentary election, Kivalov was a member of the Verkhovna Rada. In 2019 he lost re-election as an independent candidate in single-seat constituency 135 (Odesa Oblast).

Notes

References

1954 births
Living people
People from Tiraspol
Moldovan emigrants to Ukraine
Academic staff of Odesa University
Party of Regions politicians
Eighth convocation members of the Verkhovna Rada
Seventh convocation members of the Verkhovna Rada
Sixth convocation members of the Verkhovna Rada
Fifth convocation members of the Verkhovna Rada
Fourth convocation members of the Verkhovna Rada
Third convocation members of the Verkhovna Rada
Ukrainian jurists
21st-century Ukrainian politicians
Members of election commissions
Central Election Commission (Ukraine)
Recipients of the Order of Prince Yaroslav the Wise, 4th class
Recipients of the Order of Prince Yaroslav the Wise, 5th class
Recipients of the Order of Merit (Ukraine), 1st class
Recipients of the Order of Merit (Ukraine), 2nd class
Recipients of the Order of Merit (Ukraine), 3rd class
Recipients of the Medal of Pushkin
Commanders of the National Order of the Cedar
Ural State Law University alumni
Laureates of the State Prize of Ukraine in the field of education
Recipients of the Honorary Diploma of the Cabinet of Ministers of Ukraine